Marie-Luce Waldmeier (born 1 July 1960 in Ambilly) is a French former alpine skier who competed in the 1980 Winter Olympics and 1984 Winter Olympics.

External links
 sports-reference.com
 

1960 births
Living people
French female alpine skiers
Olympic alpine skiers of France
Alpine skiers at the 1980 Winter Olympics
Alpine skiers at the 1984 Winter Olympics
Sportspeople from Haute-Savoie
20th-century French women